Sabrina Schmutzler is a German football striker, currently playing for FF USV Jena in the Bundesliga. She was the 2. Bundesliga's top scorer in 2008, helping Jena reach the top category. She represented Germany in the 2007 Summer Universiade.

References

1984 births
Living people
German women's footballers
FF USV Jena players
Women's association football forwards
Sportspeople from Gera
Footballers from Thuringia